Iñaki Astiz Ventura (born 5 November 1983) is a Spanish footballer who plays for Polish club Legia Warsaw II as a central defender and serves as an assistant at Legia Warsaw.

Formed at Osasuna, he spent most of his professional career at Legia Warsaw, appearing in more than 250 competitive matches.

Club career
A product of local CA Osasuna's youth system, Astiz was born in Pamplona, Navarre, and his earlier career was spent with the B team where he met Jan Urban, a former club player who was manager of the reserves at the time. Thus, he was loaned for the 2007–08 season to Legia Warsaw (where Urban would work as coach) in the Ekstraklasa, becoming the first Spaniard ever to play in that competition.

Astiz returned to Osasuna in June 2008, only to rejoin Legia immediately for five years despite still having a contract running. The former, however, retained the possibility to re-buy the player after the first two seasons.

On 21 June 2015, Astiz signed a two-year deal with APOEL FC in the Cypriot First Division. He made his competitive debut on 14 July, in a 0–0 home draw against FK Vardar in the second qualifying round of the UEFA Champions League. He scored his first goal for his new team on 12 December 2016, the second in a 2–1 home victory over Anorthosis Famagusta FC for the domestic league.

On 15 August 2017, the 33-year-old Astiz returned to Legia Warsaw. On 12 July 2021, he joined their III liga reserve team.

Coaching career
On 25 October 2021, following the promotion of Legia II head coach Marek Gołębiewski to the role of first team manager, Astiz joined his staff as an assistant coach. Despite Gołębiewski being replaced by Aleksandar Vuković in mid-December that year, Astiz kept his role and is now sharing duties with Aleksandar Radunović.

Career statistics

Honours
Legia Warsaw
Ekstraklasa: 2012–13, 2013–14, 2017–18, 2019–20
Polish Cup: 2007–08, 2011–12, 2012–13, 2014–15, 2017–18

APOEL
Cypriot First Division: 2015–16, 2016–17

References

External links

1983 births
Living people
Footballers from Pamplona
Spanish footballers
Association football defenders
Segunda División B players
CA Osasuna B players
CA Osasuna players
Ekstraklasa players
III liga players
Legia Warsaw players
Legia Warsaw II players
Cypriot First Division players
APOEL FC players
Spanish expatriate footballers
Expatriate footballers in Poland
Expatriate footballers in Cyprus
Spanish expatriate sportspeople in Poland
Spanish expatriate sportspeople in Cyprus